USS Wave was a schooner in commission in the United States Navy from 1836 until probably 1846.
 
Wave was a schooner-rigged yacht designed along pilot boat lines by John C. Stevens and built for him in 1832 at New York City by Brown and Bell. The U.S. Navy purchased her in 1836 for use in the Second Seminole War. In that campaign, she cruised the Florida coast in support of United States Army operations until 1840. After 1840, Wave served as a surveying vessel along the United States East Coast under the command of Lieutenant John R. Goldsborough.

In his History of the American Sailing Navy, Howard I. Chapelle suggests that she was sold in 1846. However, no evidence has been found to corroborate or refute that assertion. Chapelle also states that as of the time of his book's publication in 1949, a model of Wave resided in the New York Yacht Clubs model room.

Notes

References

Chapelle, Howard I. The History of the American Sailing Navy: The Ships and Their Development. New York: W. W. Norton and Company, Inc., 1949. .

Schooners of the United States Navy
Individual yachts
Ships built in New York City
1832 ships
Survey ships of the United States Navy
Seminole War ships of the United States